The men's discus throw event at the 1934 British Empire Games was held on 5 August at the White City Stadium in London, England.

Results

References

Athletics at the 1934 British Empire Games
1934